The Movement for Constitutional Freedoms (Movimento per le Libertà Statutarie, MLS) was a liberal political party in San Marino.

It was launched on 21 April 1964 by Leo Dominicini and its main goals were to defend civil liberties and to reinforce constitutional checks and balances. Influenced by the Italian Radical Party, MLS strongly supported the extensive use of referendum.

Between 1973 and 1974, the party entered the government, along with the Christian Democrats and the Socialists. In 1974, MLS had what was its best electoral result: 2.9 percent of the vote. Later that year, Dominicini died and the party was disbanded by 1978.

Defunct political parties in San Marino
1964 establishments in San Marino
1978 disestablishments in San Marino
Political parties established in 1964
Political parties disestablished in 1978
Radical parties
Liberal parties in San Marino